Teg Ali Teg was a Bhojpuri author and poet. He was from Varanasi and is known for his book Badmash Darpan. He is credited as the first person to write ghazals in Bhojpuri.

Work 
His most famous book, Basmash Darpan, is a collection of Bhojpuri ghazals that describe the habit and customs of people of the Benaras. This book was published in 1885 by the Bharat Jiwan Press in Varanasi.

References 

Indian poets